is a Japanese video game developer founded by ex-employees of Spike Chunsoft. It was formed in 2017 by Danganronpa series writer Kazutaka Kodaka, composer Masafumi Takada and illustrator Rui Komatsuzaki, as well as Zero Escape director Kotaro Uchikoshi. The company is working on several games, and collaborated with Pierrot on the 2020 anime series Akudama Drive.

History

Kazutaka Kodaka, the writer of Spike Chunsoft's Danganronpa franchise, started thinking about how he wanted to create his own development company where he could do new things, following the completion of the anime television series Danganronpa 3 (2016) and the video game Danganronpa V3 (2017). He discussed it with the Danganronpa composer and character designer, Masafumi Takada and Rui Komatsuzaki, who also were interested in the idea; Takada founded the company in 2017, as he had already been involved in the launch of other companies. Kodaka also invited other people to join the company, including Kotaro Uchikoshi, the director and scenario writer for Spike Chunsoft's Zero Escape series; the Danganronpa illustrator Shimadoriru; Takumi Nakazawa, the director and co-writer of KID's Infinity series; and the Danganronpa novelist Yoichirou Koizumi. Kodaka, Takada, Komatsuzaki and Uchikoshi are the core members of the company, and Kodaka is its representative. The company's name is a wordplay on Tokyo – where they are based – and the Japanese word , thus meaning "Too Crazy Games".

The company was announced to the public in September 2018, announcing that four projects were under development. Three have been revealed as the games World's End Club and Master Detective Archives: Rain Code, and the anime series Akudama Drive. Rain Code began development prior to Kodaka's departure from Spike Chunsoft. In addition to these four projects, the company announced and released the FMV game Death Come True in 2020, and announced the "Extreme Baseball" multimedia project Tribe Nine. The goal of the company, according to Kodaka, is to create new intellectual properties, and for the staff to also create their own indie game projects; he also mentioned that he would still like to go back to the Danganronpa franchise at some point in the future.

Works

Video games

Anime

References

External links
 

Japanese companies established in 2017
Software companies based in Tokyo
Video game companies established in 2017
Video game companies of Japan
Video game development companies